The International Journal of Biological Sciences is a peer-reviewed open access scientific journal published by Ivyspring International Publisher. It publishes original articles, reviews, and short research communications in all areas of biological sciences. Articles are archived in PubMed Central. The editor-in-chief is Chuxia Deng (National Institutes of Health).

Abstracting and indexing 
The journal is abstracted and indexed in MEDLINE/PubMed, Science Citation Index Expanded, Current Contents/Life Sciences, Current Contents/Clinical Medicine, Biological Abstracts, BIOSIS Previews, The Zoological Record, EMBASE, Chemical Abstracts, CAB International, and Scopus. According to the Journal Citation Reports, the journal has a 2016 impact factor of 3.873.

References

External links 
 

Biology journals
Open access journals
Publications established in 2005
English-language journals
Ivyspring International Publisher journals